Crime at the Chinese Restaurant is a 1981 Italian "poliziottesco"-comedy film directed by Bruno Corbucci. It is the eighth chapter in the Nico Giraldi film series; in this chapter Tomas Milian  plays a double role, the inspector Nico Giraldi and the Chinese Ciu Ci Ciao, a character reprised, with slight changes, from the role of Sakura that the same Milian played in the 1975 spaghetti western The White, the Yellow, and the Black.

Cast 
 Tomas Milian as Nico Giraldi / Ciu Ci Ciao 
 Bombolo as  Bombolo
 Enzo Cannavale as  Vincenzo Quagliarulo
  Olimpia Di Nardo as  Angela 
 John Chen  as Chan Zeng Piao 
 Giacomo Furia as  Giudice Arducci
 Massimo Vanni as  Brigadier Gargiulo 
 Alfredo Rizzo as  Il marito dell'amante di Papetti

Release
The film was released in Italy on November 19, 1981.

See also 
 List of Italian films of 1981

References

External links

1981 films
Films directed by Bruno Corbucci
Films scored by Detto Mariano
Italian crime comedy films
Poliziotteschi films
Films set in Rome
1980s crime comedy films
1981 comedy films
1980s Italian-language films
1980s Italian films